Ernocornutia is a genus of moths belonging to the family Tortricidae.

Species
Ernocornutia alpha  Razowski & Wojtusiak, 2010
Ernocornutia altonapoana  Razowski & Wojtusiak, 2009
Ernocornutia altovolans  Razowski & Wojtusiak, 2010
Ernocornutia basisignata  Razowski & Wojtusiak, 2010
Ernocornutia beta  Razowski & Wojtusiak, 2010
Ernocornutia capronata  Razowski, 1988 
Ernocornutia carycodes  (Meyrick, 1926) 
Ernocornutia catopta  Razowski, 1988
Ernocornutia chiribogana  Razowski & Wojtusiak, 2008
Ernocornutia firna  Razowski & Wojtusiak, 2008
Ernocornutia gualaceoana  Razowski & Wojtusiak, 2006
Ernocornutia lamna  Razowski & Wojtusiak, 2010
Ernocornutia limona  Razowski & Wojtusiak, 2006
Ernocornutia paracatopta  Razowski & Wojtusiak, 2008
Ernocornutia pilaloana  Razowski & Wojtusiak, 2008
Ernocornutia pululahuana  Razowski & Wojtusiak, 2008
Ernocornutia sangayana  Razowski & Wojtusiak, 2008
Ernocornutia termasiana Razowski & Wojtusiak, 2008

References

 , 2005, World Catalogue of Insects 5
 , 1988, Acta zool. cracov. 31: 397.
 , 2009: Tortricidae (Lepidoptera) from the mountains of Ecuador and remarks on their geographical distribution. Part IV. Eastern Cordillera. Acta Zoologica Cracoviensia 51B (1-2): 119-187. doi:10.3409/azc.52b_1-2.119-187. Full article: .
 , 2010: Tortricidae (Lepidoptera) from Peru. Acta Zoologica Cracoviensia 53B (1-2): 73-159. . Full article: .

External links
tortricidae.com

Euliini
Tortricidae genera
Taxa named by Józef Razowski